Fishnish is a ferry terminal on the Isle of Mull, roughly halfway between Tobermory and Craignure. It is owned and operated by Caledonian MacBrayne. It is served by the ferry that crosses the Sound of Mull to and from Lochaline.

It consists of a slipway sticking out into the Sound of Mull with a vehicle queuing area stretching back onto the road, a car park next to the slipway, and a small café next to the slipway with public toilets and an electronic display showing ferry times and other information.

There is a forest open to the public for walks in and around Fishnish. Beside the current Fishnish is Ceadha Leth Torcail (Gaelic for "the pier of Torquil's half-share", an historic cattle harbour).

Footnotes

Buildings and structures on the Isle of Mull
Ports and harbours of Scotland